Travail, famille, patrie was the tripartite motto of the French State (usually known as Vichy France) during World War II. It replaced the republican motto, Liberté, égalité, fraternité of the Third French Republic.

Institution
The Law of 10 July 1940 gave Marshal Pétain full powers to draw up a constitution before being submitted to the Nation and guaranteeing "the rights of Work, of the Family and of the Homeland (la Patrie)". That constitution was never promulgated.

In the Revue des deux Mondes (Two Worlds Magazine) of 15 September 1940, Marshal Pétain wrote this repudiation of the motto of the French Republic. Liberté, Égalité, Fraternité : When our young people […] approach adult life, we shall say to them  […] that real liberty cannot be exercised except under the shelter of a guiding authority, which they must respect, which they must obey […]. We shall then tell them that equality [should] set itself within the framework of a hierarchy, founded on the diversity of office and merits. […] Finally, we shall tell them that there is no way of having true brotherhood except within those natural groups, the family, the town, the homeland.

The motto Travail, Famille, Patrie was originally that of the Croix-de-Feu, then of the Parti social français (PSF or French Social Party) founded by Colonel de La Rocque.

It has often been written that these three words express the Révolution nationale (RN), the National Revolution undertaken by the Vichy regime.

Travail (Work)
On 24 April 1941 Marshal Pétain officially inaugurated 1 May as the fête du Travail et de la Concorde sociale, the day on which work and mutual understanding were celebrated.

The regime won over some trades unionists for the drawing up of a Work Charter. In it they declared themselves against both capitalism and Marxism, the regime advocated the finding of a third way.

It is often told that in 1941 the Vichy Government set up a retirement system; the allowance for old, waged workers, but it really renewed the old contribution-based retirement system, which had been devalued by inflation and extraordinary expenses.

Famille (Family)
The regime wrote Mothers’ Day into the calendar. With regard to the family, there had been continuity rather than a break with the family policy of the period of the Daladier government, which continued through the Pétain years and would later continue in the Fourth Republic.

Patrie (Homeland)
The nationalism of Pétain, who saw himself as maintaining the tradition of the victorious nationalism of 1918, did not stop his collaborating with the Nazi regime. Until he died, he kept a certain degree of Germanophobia of the sort expressed by Charles Maurras. He had no pro-German or anti-British record from before the war. Several times, he restated that he regarded himself as the ally and friend of Great Britain. In his broadcast of 23 June 1940, he reproached Winston Churchill for the speech made by Churchill on 22 June 1940, following the signing of the armistice on that day.

Footnotes

See also 
List of political slogans
 Liberté, Égalité, Fraternité, motto of the French Republic.
La Nation, la Loi, le Roi, motto of the constitutional Kingdom of France
Salazar's Estado Novo's motto Deus, Pátria e Família (meaning "God, Fatherland, and Family")

External links 
Study Centre Edmond Michelet, Vichy family policy on the centremichelet.org site (fr).
Rennes Academy, Vichy Propaganda and Collaboration, on the ac-rennes.fr site (fr).

French words and phrases
National symbols of France
Mottos
Vichy France